Brigitte Michael "Mickey" Sumner (born 19 January 1984) is an English actress best known for her film roles as Sophie Levee in Frances Ha (2012) and Farrah in The Mend (2014) and her television roles as Katia on Low Winter Sun (2013) and Bess Till on Snowpiercer (2020).  She also portrayed Patti Smith in CBGB (2013).

Sumner is the daughter of actress Trudie Styler and rock musician Sting.

Early life
Sumner was born at Portland Hospital in London, the oldest daughter of musician Sting (born Gordon Matthew Thomas Sumner) and actress Trudie Styler. Sumner is the older sister of musician Eliot Sumner and the younger half-sister of musician Joe Sumner.

Career
Sumner began her acting career in 2006 with roles in a series of short films.  In 2011, she landed the role of Francesca on the Showtime series The Borgias appearing in four episodes.  Sumner garnered significant attention for her role as Sophie Levee, starring opposite Greta Gerwig, in 2012's Frances Ha.

In 2013, Sumner portrayed Patti Smith in CBGB. She also made her official off-Broadway debut opposite Carol Kane in the Atlantic Theater Company's The Lying Lesson in April 2013.

Sumner was featured as Katia on the AMC Network series Low Winter Sun.  In 2013, Sumner acted in a series of films including Half the Perfect World, The Mend and Anesthesia.

Sumner starred in the independent film The Mend, alongside Josh Lucas and Stephen Plunkett.  The film premiered at the SXSW Film Festival in March 2014.

Personal life
She became engaged to Chris Kantrowitz in June 2016, and they married in Tuscany in July 2017. As of 2019 they have one son, Akira Rogue Kantrowitz (born 31 December 2016).

Filmography

Film

Television

References

External links

1984 births
Living people
Actresses from London
Sting (musician)
21st-century English actresses
English film actresses
English television actresses
Mickey